ODMA is Open Document Management API.

ODMA may also refer to:

 Opportunity-Driven Multiple Access, a telecommunications standard
 Oxford Dictionary of the Middle Ages, a publication by Arizona Center for Medieval and Renaissance Studies